Peyrolles-en-Provence is a commune in the Bouches-du-Rhône department in the Provence-Alpes-Côte d'Azur region in Southern France. Part of the Aix-Marseille-Provence Metropolis, it is located 18 km (11.2 mi) northeast of Aix-en-Provence. In 2018, Peyrolles-en-Provence had a population of 5,125.

Demographics

See also
Communes of the Bouches-du-Rhône department

References

External links
Official website (in French)

Communes of Bouches-du-Rhône
Bouches-du-Rhône communes articles needing translation from French Wikipedia